A Game of Dwarves is a dwarf-themed real-time strategy dungeon management game developed by Zeal Game Studio and published by Paradox Interactive in 2012-2013. A PlayStation 3 version was in development but was cancelled before release.

Gameplay
The gameplay has been compared to the Dungeon Keeper game series.

Reception

The game received "mixed" reviews according to the review aggregation website Metacritic. Reviews of the game criticized its quality, saying A Game of Dwarves was a pale imitation of Dungeon Keeper and "astonishingly ugly".

References

External links

2012 video games
Cancelled PlayStation 3 games
Paradox Interactive games
Real-time strategy video games
Video games developed in Sweden
Windows games
Windows-only games